St Olave's Church is a small church which was founded in 1053 by Lady Gytha, the mother of King Harold. The church is dedicated to Saint Olaf, a Viking king who converted to Christianity. It was rebuilt in the late 14th century.

References

Further reading
Orme, Nicholas (2014) The Churches of Medieval Exeter, Impress Books, ISBN 9781907605512; pp. 150-53.

External links 
 St. Olave's Church

Churches in Exeter
Church of England church buildings in Devon
1053 establishments in England
Rebuilt churches in the United Kingdom
14th-century church buildings in England
Grade II* listed churches in Devon
Churches dedicated to Saint Olav in the United Kingdom